Lincoln Township is an inactive township in Stone County, in the U.S. state of Missouri.

Lincoln Township was erected in 1870, taking its name from Abraham Lincoln, 16th President of the United States.

References

Townships in Missouri
Townships in Stone County, Missouri